Bunker Creek is a stream in the U.S. state of Montana. It is a tributary to the Flathead River.

Bunker Creek was named after Page S. Bunker, a forestry official.

References

Rivers of Montana
Rivers of Flathead County, Montana